ANT1 Europe (pronounced "Antenna Europe") is a subscription TV channel established in 2006. The channel is partly owned by ANT1 Group. It is a general entertainment channel screening international, Greek and some locally produced programs.

External links
Official Website

ANT1 Group
Television channels and stations established in 2006